The buff-throated apalis (Apalis rufogularis) is a species of bird in the family Cisticolidae.
It is found in Angola, Benin, Burundi, Cameroon, Central African Republic, Republic of the Congo, Democratic Republic of the Congo, Equatorial Guinea, Gabon, Kenya, Nigeria, Rwanda, South Sudan, Tanzania, Uganda, and Zambia.

References

This species has a very large range, and hence does not approach the thresholds for Vulnerable under the range size criterion.

buff-throated apalis
Birds of the Gulf of Guinea
Birds of Central Africa
buff-throated apalis
buff-throated apalis
Taxonomy articles created by Polbot